Berich (also Romanized as Berīch; also known as Behrīj) is a village in Soghan Rural District, Soghan District, Arzuiyeh County, Kerman Province, Iran. At the 2006 census, its population was 102, in 33 families.

References 

Populated places in Arzuiyeh County